Kuala Lumpur City Football Club, known simply as KL City FC, is a Malaysian professional football club based in Kuala Lumpur. The club competes in the Malaysia Super League, the top level of Malaysian football, and was founded in 1974 as Federal Territory by the Kuala Lumpur Football Association (KLFA). It was later renamed Kuala Lumpur FA and Kuala Lumpur United, before renaming to its current name in 2021.

Kuala Lumpur City won two Malaysian league titles, four Malaysian Cups, three Malaysian FA Cups, and three Malaysian Charity Shields. It also played in the group stages of the Asian Club Championship on two occasions.

Following its founding, a fierce rivalry developed between Kuala Lumpur and Selangor mainly due to their geographical location. The battle between these two teams is often referred to as the Klang Valley Derby, which was renewed in the 2010 season after Kuala Lumpur ended a seven-year spell in the second-tier with promotion to the Malaysia Super League. Kuala Lumpur were relegated to the second-tier Malaysia Premier League in 2012 and the following year, in 2013, Kuala Lumpur were relegated to the third-tier Malaysia FAM League for the first time in its history.

History
Kuala Lumpur had its most successful period in the late 1980s when they won the national league twice, in 1986 and 1988. They also won the Malaysia Cup for three consecutive years (1987, 1988 and 1989). The team enjoyed considerable success in cup competitions in the 1990s, winning the Malaysian FA Cup in 1993, 1994 and 1999. Kuala Lumpur won the Malaysian Charity Shield on three occasions, in 1988, 1995 and 2000.

In September 2020, the club was privatized in accordance to the privatization process by the Football Association of Malaysia and was renamed as Kuala Lumpur United. In December 2020, Stanley Bernard was named the new CEO of the club.

In March 2021, prior to the 2021 Malaysia Super League season, the team changed its name to Kuala Lumpur City. During the same season, Kuala Lumpur City defeated Johor Darul Ta'zim 2–0 in the final of the 2021 Malaysia Cup, winning the cup for the first time in 32 years.

In February 2023, Rinani Group Berhad acquired a majority stake in the club.

Players

Current squad

Management and coaching staff

List of head coaches

Honours

Domestic

League
 Malaysian First Division
 Winners (2): 1986, 1988
Runners-up (3): 1982, 1987, 1989
 Malaysian Second Division
 Winners (1): 2017
 Malaysian Third Division
Runners-up (1): 2014

Cup
 Malaysia Cup
 Winners (4): 1987, 1988, 1989, 2021
Runners-up (1): 1985

 Malaysia FA Cup
 Winners (3): 1993, 1994, 1999
Runners-up (1): 1992

 Malaysia Charity Shield
 Winners (3): 1988, 1995, 2000
Runners-up (5): 1987, 1989, 1990, 1994, 2022

 Federal Territory Minister Cup
 Winners (2): 2021, 2023
Runners-up (1): 2022

Continental
 Asian Club Championship
1987: Group stage (2nd in Group B)
1989–90: Group stage (2nd in Group A)
 Asian Cup Winners' Cup
1994–95: Quarter-finals
 AFC Cup
Runners-up (1): 2022
 ASEAN Champions' Cup
 Winners (2): 1987, 1989

U21 team
 Malaysian President's Cup
 Winners (3): 1989, 1992, 1998
Runners-up (2): 1995, 2010

Seasons

Note: A single round-robin league system was instituted in 1979 following the entry of Brunei FA, Kuala Lumpur FA, Sabah FA and Sarawak FA into mainstream Malaysian football. For three years until 1981, the league remained no more than a preliminary round for the knock-out stages of the Malaysia Cup. In 1982, a League Cup was introduced to differentiate the league winners from the Malaysia Cup champions.

Continental record
All results list Kuala Lumpur's goal tally first.

References

External links
 

 
1974 establishments in Malaysia
Malaysia Cup winners
Malaysia Premier League clubs
Malaysia Super League clubs
Malaysia FAM League clubs
Association football clubs established in 1974